Bonner SC is a German association football club based in Bonn. The club was formed in 1965 through the merger of Bonner FV and Tura Bonn. Its former women's football department won the German national championship in 1975.

History

Bonner FV was founded in 1901 and was known early on as the "Club of Academics" because many of its leaders and members were teachers and professors. The side achieved good results as a tier II team prior to World War II, playing in the tier one Gauliga Mittelrhein at times. In 1959, FV won the Verbandsliga Mittelrhein (III) championship and moved up to 2nd Oberliga West (Division Two West).

Tura was formed in 1925 through a merger of the clubs FC Normannia and FC Borussia and drew its membership from the working class. The combined side's lineage also included the club FC Regina Bonn founded in 1904. Like Bonner FV, Tura played as a tier II team and their greatest success was in winning the 1962 west German amateur championship and their subsequent appearance in the national amateur final, which they lost 0:1 to SC Tegel. Since its founding in 1965, Bonner SC has played as a tier III or IV side except for a handful of seasons spent in various level II leagues between 1966–67 and 1976–77.

Cuban connection
In 1999, the club drew a lot of attention when then owner Hans-Robert Viol signed the complete Cuba national football team for the remainder of the season with the approval of Cuban leader Fidel Castro, who ordered the players to remain amateurs and only be paid pocket money. They were the first 15 Cuban football players to have a spell abroad during the Castro regime and only four of them were expected to play in the Germans fourth tier side.

In 2000–01, they fell as low as Verbandsliga Mittelrhein (V). Despite the drought of success, Bonner SC were able to muster-up a phenomenal season in the NRW-Liga in the 2008–09 season and become champions leading to their promotion back to the Regionalliga for the 2009–10 Season.

The club had to declare insolvency in July 2010 and was therefore unable to enter the Regionalliga. The team, 7 million euros in debt, was also barred from entering the NRW-Liga as it could not provide the necessary guarantees to prove it would be able to survive financially. Having declared insolvency after the start of the new season, the side could only enter the league below, the Mittelrheinliga, under the condition of being automatically relegated at the end of season, which it declined and paused for a year. Bonner SC entered the tier seven Landesliga Mittelrhein 1 for the 2011–12 season.

From 2014 to 2016 Bonner SC played in the fifth tier of the league system, the Mittelrheinliga. In the 2015–16 season the club won the league and earned promotion to Regionalliga West.

Current squad

Staff

 Head coach: Thorsten Nehrbauer
 Co-Trainer: Gordon Addai
 Goalkeeper-Trainer: Waldemar Polec

Former players

  Jake Rennie - former Grenada international

Honors
The club's honours:

League
 NRW-Liga (V)
 Champions (1): 2008–09
 Mittelrheinliga (III/IV/V)
 Champions (8): 1958–59, 1961–62, 1967–68, 1971–72, 1975–76, 1984–85, 2000–01, 2015–16
 Landesliga Mittelrhein (V/VI)
 Champions (4): 1951–52, 1956–57, 1958–59, 2012–13

Cup
 Middle Rhine Cup (Tiers III-V)
 Winners (1): 2016–2017

References

External links
Official team site
The Abseits Guide to German Soccer

 
Football clubs in Germany
Football clubs in North Rhine-Westphalia
Association football clubs established in 1965
Sport in Bonn
1965 establishments in Germany
2. Bundesliga clubs